I-46 was the first of three Type C cruiser submarines of the C2 sub-class built for the Imperial Japanese Navy. Commissioned in February 1944, she operated in World War II during the Battle of Leyte and Battle of Leyte Gulf before she was lost in October 1944.

Design and description
They displaced  surfaced and  submerged.

For surface running, the boats were powered by two  diesel engines, each driving one propeller shaft. When submerged each propeller was driven by a  electric motor. They could reach  on the surface and  underwater.

The boats were armed with eight internal bow  torpedo tubes and carried a total of 20 torpedoes. They were also armed with a single /40 deck gun and two single or twin mounts for  Type 96 anti-aircraft guns. They were equipped to carry one Type A midget submarine aft of the conning tower.

Construction and commissioning

Ordered under the Rapid Naval Armaments Supplement Programme and built by the Sasebo Naval Arsenal at Sasebo, Japan, I-46 was laid down on 21 November 1942 with the name Submarine No. 376 and was numbered I-46 on 25 May 1943. Launched on 3 June 1943 and provisionally attached to the Yokosuka Naval District, she was completed and commissioned on 29 February 1944.

Service history

Upon commissioning, I-46 formally was attached to the Yokosuka Naval District and assigned to Submarine Squadron 11 for shakedown and work-ups. After repairs and testing, she arrived at Sasebo Navy Yard on 7 May 1944 for additional repairs.

I-46 was reassigned to Submarine Division 15 in the 6th Fleet on 30 May 1944. On 12 August 1944, her commanding officer submitted a memorandum to the headquarters of the 6th Fleet and the commander of Submarine Squadron 11 suggesting improvements to the Type 13 air search radar installation and application of the anti-radar coating aboard I-46.

On 13 October 1944, the Combined Fleet ordered the activation of Operation Shō-Gō 1, the defense of the Philippine Islands, in anticipation of an American invasion of the islands. Her patrol area was the westernmost of those assigned to the submarines of her group, and was adjacent to the area assigned to the submarine .

On 20 October 1944, the Battle of Leyte began with U.S. landings on Leyte. In response, major units of the Imperial Japanese Navy converged on Leyte, resulting in the Battle of Leyte Gulf, which lasted from 23 to 26 October 1944. On 24 October, the 6th Fleet ordered eleven submarines, including I-46, to converge in an area extending from Samar to Surigao Strait.

While I-46 was operating east of Leyte on 25 October 1944, a U.S. patrol plane forced her to dive at 06:45. A ship she identified from its propeller noises as a destroyer pursued her for the next eleven hours, during which she heard over 200 distant depth charge explosions.

On 26 October 1944, I-46 transmitted a report that she had sighted a small Allied convoy east of her patrol area. She was never heard from again. When the 6th Fleet ordered her to move to a new patrol station east of Leyte on 27 October 1944, she did not acknowledge it.

Loss 

The circumstances of I-46′s loss remain unknown. While the aircraft carriers steered away from the submarine contact at high speed, Gridley made three depth charge attacks against the submarine and Helm made four. After Helm′s fourth attack, which took place at 14:11, a large explosion followed by two smaller ones occurred. Oil and air bubbles appeared on the surface, and damaged deck planking and human remains were recovered after the attack.

On both 30 October and 1 November 1944, I-46, and I-54 all failed to make scheduled daily 19:00 status reports. On 2 December 1944, the Imperial Japanese Navy declared I-46 to be presumed lost east of the Philippines with the loss of all 112 men on board. She was stricken from the Navy list on 10 March 1945.

The identity of the submarine Gridley and Helm sank remains a mystery, and has been reported both as I-46 and I-54.

Notes

References
 

 

1943 ships
Japanese submarines lost during World War II
Ships built by Sasebo Naval Arsenal
Type C2 submarines
World War II submarines of Japan
Battle of Leyte Gulf
Maritime incidents in April 1944
Maritime incidents in October 1944
World War II shipwrecks in the Philippine Sea
World War II shipwrecks in the Pacific Ocean
Ships lost with all hands
Submarines sunk by United States warships
Missing submarines of World War II